Samar Dasht (also Romanized as Samar Dasht) is a village in Rudbar Rural District, in the Central District of Tafresh County, Markazi Province, Iran. At the 2006 census, its population was 109, in 28 families.

References 

Populated places in Tafresh County